Grylloblatta newberryensis is a species of insect in the family Grylloblattidae. It is found in central Oregon, United States.

Its type locality is Newberry Volcano in central Oregon.

References

Grylloblattidae
Insects described in 2015
Insects of the United States